Crinan is a small village located on the west coast of Scotland in the region known as Knapdale, which is part of Argyll and Bute.
Before the Crinan Canal was built, Crinan was named Port Righ which meant the king's port. The canal was named from the small settlement of Crinan Ferry on the edge of Loch Crinan where a small ferry landed. The name Crinan probably derives from the Creones tribe who lived in the area in 140 AD. 
The canal was designed to provide a short cut between the west coast and islands at one end and the Clyde estuary at the other, and so avoid the long voyage around the south end of the Kintyre Peninsula.

By the canal basin is a coffee shop and the nearby hotel and looks out across Loch Crinan to Duntrune Castle. Crinan Post Office is in the old Harbour House. Crinan Boatyard provides services and facilities for commercial and leisure boaters. A scallop farming business operates from the loch. The  Crinan Wood is home to ferns, lichens and 24 species of bird.

Parts of the TV series The Tales of Para Handy were filmed here.

References

External links

Villages in Knapdale